This is a filmography of María Félix, who began her career in 1942. Her role in the movie Doña Bárbara transformed her into the vamp of 1940s Mexican cinema. After her roles in the Emilio Fernández movies like Enamorada (1946), Río Escondido (1948) and Maclovia (1948), she achieved great fame in Europe.

Filmography

1942–48 (First Mexican period)

1948–55 (European period)

1955–70 (Second Mexican period)

Short films appearing as herself

Television

References 
 

Actress filmographies
Mexican filmographies